Las seis suegras de Barba Azul (Bluebeard's Six Mothers-in-Law) is a 1945 black and white Argentine comedy film directed by Carlos Hugo Christensen.

Production

The black and white Lumiton production was directed by Carlos Hugo Christensen and written by César Tiempo.
It starred Pepe Arias, Guillermo Battaglia and Alberto Contreras.
It was released in Argentina on 10 August 1945.

Synopsis

A man who has been widowed six times is living with his six mothers-in-law.
He looks for a new wife.

Reception

La Nación praised Christensen's direction, moving the plot of the farce along easily. 
It said that Pepe Arias played one of his most interesting film roles.
Carlos Inzillo in Queridos Filipipones said that Christensen's film, perhaps influenced by Marcel Pagnol or René Clair, proceeds slowly and engages in manners ... this is a more  intellectual role for Pepe ... different from his usual stereotype.

Complete cast
The complete cast was:

 Pepe Arias
 Guillermo Battaglia
 Alberto Contreras
 Diego Martínez
 Susana Freyre
 María Santos
 Amalia Sánchez Ariño
 Herminia Mancini
 Gloria Ferrandiz
 María Esther Buschiazzo
 Olga Casares Pearson
 Raquel Notar
 Mónica Val
 Rita Juárez
 Ivonne Lescaut
 Olga Zubarry
 Mónica Inchauspe
 Iris Martorell
 Luis Barrilaro
 Juan Corona
 Juan Siches de Alarcón
 Olimpio Bobbio
 Cirilo Etulain
 Max Citelli
 Miguel Coiro
 Ángel Walk
 Ernesto Villegas
 Gonzalo Palomero

References
Citations

Sources

1945 films
1940s Spanish-language films
Argentine black-and-white films
1945 comedy films
Argentine comedy films